"Don't Stop!" is a song by German DJ ATB with vocals from Yolanda Rivera. It was a number-13 hit in ATB's native Germany and reached number three on the UK Singles Chart. The track was featured on many compilations. In 2000, it appeared on a mix from San Francisco's Mars & Mystre. The UK radio edit was remixed by X-Cabs.

In a Trance.nu interview on 11 May 2007, ATB considered "Don't Stop!" to be his worst production to date, and he no longer stands by it due to it being similar to his first hit, "9 PM (Till I Come)".

Track listings 
German release 1
01. Don't Stop (Airplay Edit) 3:50
02. Don't Stop (SQ-1 Mix) 6:18
03. Don't Stop (C.L.U.B.B. Mix) 5:49

German release 2
01. Don't Stop! (Airplay Edit) 3:50
02. Don't Stop! (Sash! Remix) 5:56

German release 3
01. Don't Stop! (Airplay Edit) 3:47
02. Don't Stop! (SQ.1 Mix) 6:22
03. Don't Stop! (Clubb Mix) 5:53
04. Don't Stop! (ATB Remix) 6:47
05. Don't Stop! (Spacekid Contact Woody Van Eyden Remix) 5:38
06. Don't Stop! (Sash! Remix) 5:59

US release
01. Don't Stop! (Airplay Edit) 3:46
02. Don't Stop! (X-Cabs Radio Edit) 2:44
03. Don't Stop! (SQ-1 Mix) 6:21
04. Don't Stop! (C.L.U.B.B. Mix) 5:54
05. Don't Stop! (Sash! Remix) 6:01
06. Don't Stop! (Spacekid Contacts Woody Van Eyden Remix) 5:41

UK release 1
01. Don't Stop (X-Cabs Radio Edit) 2:44
02. Don't Stop (Sequential One Edit) 4:38
03. 9PM (Till I Come) (Matt Darey Remix) 8:06

UK release 2
01. Don't Stop (X-Cabs Radio Edit) 2:44
02. Don't Stop (Sequential One Edit) 4:38
03. Don't Stop (X-Cabs Remix) 7:16
04. Don't Stop (Sequential One Remix) 6:05

Australian release
01. Don't Stop (Sequential One Radio Edit) 2:43
02. Don't Stop (X-Cabs Radio Edit) 2:41
03. Don't Stop (Sequential One Remix) 6:05
04. Don't Stop (X-Cabs Remix) 7:16

Canadian release
01. Don't Stop (Radio Edit) 3:49
02. Don't Stop (SQ-1 Mix) 6:19
03. Don't Stop (C.L.U.B.B. Mix) 5:53
04. Don't Stop (Sash! Remix) 6:02
05. Don't Stop (Spacekid Contacts Woody Van Eyden) 5:39
06. Don't Stop (ATB Remix) 6:47
07. 9 PM (Till I Come) (Radio Edit) 3:18
08. 9 PM (Till I Come) (Club Mix) 5:29
09. 9 PM (Till I Come) (Sequential One Remix) 6:11
10. 9 PM (Till I Come) (Gary D's Northern Light Remix) 7:28
11. 9 PM (Till I Come) (Signum Remix) 7:37
12. 9 PM (Till I Come) (Matt Darey Mix) 8:08

Charts

Weekly charts

Year-end charts

Release history

References

External links 
 ATB – Don't Stop at Discogs
 Yolanda Rivera at Discogs

1999 singles
1999 songs
ATB songs
Kontor Records singles
Ministry of Sound singles
Songs written by André Tanneberger
Trance songs

simple:Don't Stop